Pearce Ferry Airport  is a public use airport in Mohave County, Arizona, United States. The airport is owned by the National Park Service.

Facilities and aircraft 
It has one runway designated 1/19 with a dirt surface measuring 2,900 by 110 feet (884 x 34 m).

For the 12-month period ending April 20, 2010, the airport had 300 aircraft operations, an average of 25 per month: 67% air taxi and 33% general aviation.

References

External links 
 Pearce Ferry Airport (L25) at Arizona DOT airport directory
 
 

Airports in Mohave County, Arizona
National Park Service